Children of God is the sixth commercial studio album by Phil Wickham. Fair Trade Services released the album on April 22, 2016.

Critical reception

Awarding the album four stars at CCM Magazine, Matt Conner states, "Popular recording artist and worship leader Phil Wickham recently lost the very thing he’s most known for: his vocal ability. A risky surgery to repair his vocal cords left Wickham wondering if he might not sing again and what means for his identity. The end result is a renewed sense of his spiritual identity in Christ, and a wellspring of new songs on Children Of God...Wickham's learned lesson is a welcome truth for all of us." Taylor Berglund, reviewing the album for Charisma, writes, "Yet even though Children of Gods tracks are very sonically different, they mesh and blend well with each other to form a cohesive album. Wickham conveys the love of God and the joy of believers with every song. These songs—though disparate and experimental—never lose sight of the unifying message. Children of God is not merely the best album of Wickham's career. It's a bona fide contender for the best album of this year." Indicating in a four and a half star review at Worship Leader, Jeremy Armstrong states, "this is Phil Wickham at his best."

Giving the album four and a half stars from New Release Today, Mikayla Shriver describes, "Much like Phil Wickham's previous albums, Children of God is a force to be reckoned with. With sincerity and modernity merging into a beautiful display of love for God, you'll find yourself coming back for a second listen... and probably a thousand more." Jonathan Andre, affixing a four and a half star rating upon the album by 365 Days of Inspiring Media, says, "Phil continues to present poignant songs of praise and perseverance as this new set of songs are some of the most emotive and energetic...in his whole career." Signaling in a four star review at Jesus Freak Hideout, David Craft writes, "the album is very cohesive and unable to be dissected in a more traditional manner...this is one of the best worship albums of the year, and will likely remain so." Lucas Munachen, indicating in a four and a half star review from Jesus Freak Hideout, states, "Children of God is mezmerizing in almost every way and may possibly be Wickham's overall best. It's a satisfying and deeply emotional album all the way through." Rating the album three and a half stars for Jesus Freak Hideout, Mark Rice says, "Children of God is a wonderful experience." Christopher Smith, indicating in a four star review from Jesus Freak Hideout, opines, "Children of God is...a strong statement and a wonderful creative outlet to worship Jesus."

Timothy Yap, writing a review of the album at Hallels, states, "But not everything works...'Children of God,' on the whole, is by no means perfect. But it has far too many God-anointed moments that to miss them would be a loss." Rating the album 4.7 out of five stars for The Christian Beat, Chris Major writes, "Maintaining his reputation for energetic and inspiring praise and worship music, Children Of God more than surpasses expectations...From start to finish, Children Of Gods beautiful sounds and poetic lyrics combine in a mesmerizing, inspiring blend of praise and worship...making for an outstanding album." Andrew Funderburk, allocating the album four stars by CM Addict, says, "The album sounds like a well-woven tapestry, with careful attention to even the most minute of details." Allotting the album 3.7 stars from Today's Christian Entertainment, Laura Chambers writes, "Children of God uses a moment of weakness, fear and doubt as a jumping-off point for a new appreciation of God’s power, grace and love....Wickham doesn’t disappoint."

Track listing

Chart performance

References

2016 albums
Phil Wickham albums
Fair Trade Services albums